Illis quorum (Illis quorum meruere labores) (English: "For Those Whose Labors Have Deserved It"), is a gold medal awarded for outstanding contributions to Swedish culture, science or society.

The award was introduced in 1784 by King Gustav III, and was first awarded in 1785. Prior to 1975, the medal was awarded by the King of Sweden. Illis quorum is now awarded by the Government of Sweden, and it is currently the highest award that can be conferred upon an individual Swedish citizen by the Government. It is awarded, on average, to seven people per year.

Selected recipients
 1848 – Rafael Ginard i Sabater 
 1873 – Sophia Wilkens
 1883 – Lea Ahlborn 
 1890 – Karin Åhlin 
 1895 – Sophie Adlersparre, Emmy Rappe
 1896 – Hilda Caselli 
 1899 – Ellen Bergman 
 1904 – Anna Sandström
 1907 – Gertrud Adelborg, Anna Hierta-Retzius
 1910 – Agda Montelius
 1913 – Anna Rönström
 1918 – Kerstin Hesselgren, Emilie Rathou
 1920 – Elsa Brändström
 1921 – Frigga Carlberg
 1923 – Matilda Widegren
 1924 – Magna Sunnerdahl
 1925 – Ann-Margret Holmgren
 1927 – Selma Lagerlöf, Aurore Grandien 
 1932 – Valfrid Palmgren
 1936 – Hanna Rydh
 1942 – Eva Ramstedt
 1945 – Anna Johansson-Visborg
 1945 – Olivia Nordgren
 1946 – Naima Sahlbom
 1952 – Raoul Wallenberg
 1978 – Astrid Lindgren 
 1981 – Birgit Nilsson 
 1983 - Bengt Idestam-Almquist
 1985 – Astrid Lindgren, Sune Bergström
 1993 – Lars Lönndahl
 1994 – Putte Wickman
 1998 – Thage G. Peterson
 1999 – Arne Isacsson 
 2002 – Per Anger, Dina Schneidermann
 2003 – Birgitta Dahl 
 2005 – Lennart Johansson, Janne Schaffer 
 2006 – Peter Dahl 
 2010 – Hans Rosling
 2012 – Gunilla Bergström 
 2014 – Martin Widmark

See also
Orders, decorations, and medals of Sweden

References

Orders, decorations, and medals of Sweden
1784 establishments in Sweden
Awards established in 1784